Silvia Glatthard (born 11 March 1930) is a Swiss alpine skier. She competed in two events at the 1952 Winter Olympics.

In 1951, she married Arnold Glatthard (1910–2002), a former alpine skier and Swiss champion in 1935.

References

1930 births
Living people
Swiss female alpine skiers
Olympic alpine skiers of Switzerland
Alpine skiers at the 1952 Winter Olympics
Sportspeople from Bern
20th-century Swiss women